Adrián Peralta (born 8 May 1982 in Burzaco) is an Argentine footballer currently playing for Deportivo Morón in the Primera B Metropolitana.

Career
Peralta started his career at 3rd division side Tristán Suárez in 2000.

In 2003, he was signed by Instituto de Córdoba whom he helped to win the Primera B Nacional Apertura 2003 tournament. At the end of the 2003-2004 season the club were promoted to the Primera. Instituto managed to avoid relegation at the end of the 2004-2005 season, but Peralta left the team to join RCD Mallorca of La Liga in Spain. His transfer to Europe did not work out and he soon returned to Argentina to play for Newell's Old Boys.

After one year with Newell's Peralta moved on again, this time to Lanús. In 2007, he was part of the squad that won the Apertura 2007 tournament, Lanús' first ever top flight league title.

In January 2010 Peralta joined Huracán, on loan. However, he returned to Lanús for the following season

He had to retire from football at 28 years old because of heart problems.

Honours

References

External links
 Argentine Primera statistics
 Player profile on the Lanús website

Argentine footballers
Association football midfielders
Instituto footballers
La Liga players
RCD Mallorca players
Argentine people of Spanish descent
Newell's Old Boys footballers
Club Atlético Lanús footballers
Club Atlético Huracán footballers
Argentine Primera División players
Argentine expatriate sportspeople in Spain
People from Burzaco
1982 births
Living people
Sportspeople from Buenos Aires Province